The 1958–59 Egyptian Premier League, was the 9th season of the Egyptian Premier League, the top Egyptian professional league for association football clubs, since its establishment in 1948. The season started on 3 October 1958 and concluded on 17 April 1959.
Defending champions Al Ahly won their 9th consecutive and 9th overall Egyptian Premier League title in the club history.

League table 

 (C)= Champions, (R)= Relegated, Pld = Matches played; W = Matches won; D = Matches drawn; L = Matches lost; F = Goals for; A = Goals against; ± = Goal difference; Pts = Points.

Teams

References

External links 
 All Egyptian Competitions Info

5
1958–59 in African association football leagues
1958–59 in Egyptian football